Below is a list of major treaties of the Ottoman Empire.

See also 
List of treaties of Turkey

References 

Ottoman EMpire
Military history of the Ottoman Empire

Treaty